The Chli Windgällen (2,986 m) is a mountain of the Glarus Alps, overlooking the valley of the Reuss in the canton of Uri. It lies west of the Gross Windgällen, on the range north of the Maderanertal.

References

External links
Chli Windgällen on Hikr

Mountains of the Alps
Mountains of Switzerland
Mountains of the canton of Uri